Clayton Renato Baptistella (born 7 December 1983), is a Brazilian futsal player who plays for Montesilvano as a Pivot.

Clayton Baptistella is a member of the Italian national futsal team.

Honours
 1 Coppa Italia (2009)

References

External links
Luparense C5

1983 births
Living people
Italian men's futsal players
Luparense Calcio a 5 players
Brazilian emigrants to Italy